Orotrechus is a genus of troglobitic beetles in the family Carabidae, containing the following species:

 Orotrechus caranthiacus Mandl, 1940
 Orotrechus cavallensis Jeannel, 1928
 Orotrechus dallarmii Daffner, 1987
 Orotrechus euganeus Pace, 1974
 Orotrechus fabianii Gestro, 1900
 Orotrechus fiorii Alzona, 1899
 Orotrechus forojulensis Busulini, 1959
 Orotrechus gigas Vigna Taglianti, 1981
 Orotrechus giordanii Agazzi, 1957
 Orotrechus globulipennis Schaum, 1860
 Orotrechus gracilis Meggioiano, 1961
 Orotrechus haraldi Daffnan, 1990
 Orotrechus holdhausi Ganglbauer, 1904
 Orotrechus jamae C. Etonti & M. Etonti, 1979
 Orotrechus lucensis Scheibel, 1935
 Orotrechus mandriolae Ganglbauer, 1911
 Orotrechus martinellii Martinelli, 1987
 Orotrechus messai J. Muller, 1913
 Orotrechus montellensis Agazzi, 1956
 Orotrechus muellerianus Schatzmayr, 1907
 Orotrechus novaki Mlejnek, J. Moravec & Udrzal, 1994
 Orotrechus pavionis Maggiolaro, 1961
 Orotrechus pominii Tamanini, 1954
 Orotrechus puchneri Lebenbauer, 1998
 Orotrechus robustus Jeannel, 1928
 Orotrechus ruffoi Tamanini, 1954
 Orotrechus sabenelloi Daffner, 1983
 Orotrechus schwienbacheri Grottolo & Martinelli, 1991
 Orotrechus slapniki Drovenik, Miejnek & J. Moravec, 1997
 Orotrechus springeri J. Muller, 1928
 Orotrechus stephani J. Muller, 1913
 Orotrechus subpannonicus Daffner, 1994
 Orotrechus targionii Della Torre, 1881
 Orotrechus theresiae Casale, M. Etonti & Giachino, 1992
 Orotrechus torretassoi J. Muller, 1928
 Orotrechus venetianus Winkler, 1911
 Orotrechus vicentinus Castro, 1907
 Orotrechus winkleri Meggiolaro, 1959

References

Trechinae